Zhao Chang ( 10th century), courtesy name Changzhi, was a Chinese painter during the Song dynasty.

He was a disciple of flower-and-bird painter Teng Changyou (滕昌祐). He also used the methods of the Southern Tang painter Xu Chongsi.

References

People from Guanghan
Painters from Sichuan
10th-century Chinese painters
Song dynasty painters